Jolanta Sikorska-Kulesza (born 1957) is professor  (since 2011) at the University of Warsaw, Department of History, member of the Research Team for the Social History of Poland in the 19th and 20th Centuries.

She is an alumna of the University of Warsaw (Master's degree: 1980, Ph.D.:1900, habilitation: 2005).

Books
2020: Album policmajstra warszawskiego. Pamiątka buntu od 1860 do 1865, 
2004: Zło tolerowane. Prostytucja w Królestwie Polskim w XIX wieku
 2020: Tolerated Evil; Prostitution in the Kingdom of Poland in the Nineteenth Century, 
2013 (with co-authors) Dzieje rodziny Ciechanowieckich herbu Dąbrowa (XIV-XXI wiek)
2011: W kalejdoskopie dziejów. Podręcznik do historii. XIX wiek
2010 (with S. Ciara) W kalejdoskopie dziejów. Podręcznik do historii. Czasy nowożytne,
1995: Deklasacja drobnej szlachty na Litwie i Białorusi w XIX wieku

Awards and decorations
2011: Departmental decoration Medal of the Commission of National Education
2005: Clio Award of 2nd degree, University of Warsaw

References

External links
dr hab. Jolanta Sikorska-Kulesza bibliography

1957 births
Living people
University of Warsaw alumni
Academic staff of the University of Warsaw
Polish historians
Historians of Poland